Kentucky Route 1136 is a north–south rural secondary state highway located entirely in Hardin County in north-central Kentucky.

Route description
The route begins at a junction with U.S. Route 31W south of Glendale Junction. It traverses Interstate 65 (I-65) via an overpass with no access to the freeway. The route then enters the town of Glendale, where it meets KY 222. It continues north-northeast to intersect U.S. Route 31W Bypass (US 31W Byp) before traversing the Wendell H. Ford Western Kentucky Parkway via an overpass and ending at a junction with the main alignment of US 31W and KY 61 within Elizabethtown city limits.

Major intersections

References

1136
1136
Elizabethtown metropolitan area